The UCI Road World Cup was a season-long road cycling competition held from 1989 until 2004 and comprising ten one-day events.

History
The competition was inaugurated in 1989, and replaced the Super Prestige Pernod International. In the first three years, the competition was sponsored by Perrier. The competition determined a winning individual, and a winning team.

The record number of wins was Paolo Bettini's three consecutive wins in 2002, 2003, and the last edition in 2004.  Three riders won the competition twice: Maurizio Fondriest (1991 and 1993), Johan Museeuw (1995 and 1996) and Michele Bartoli (1997 and 1998).

The competition was run in parallel to the UCI Road World Rankings, which included all UCI sanctioned events. Both were replaced at the end of the 2004 season with the inauguration of the UCI ProTour and UCI Continental Circuits.

Races

 Permanent events

 Milan–San Remo (1989–2004)
 Tour of Flanders (1989–2004)
 Liège–Bastogne–Liège (1989–2004)
 Paris–Roubaix (1989–2004)
 Paris–Tours (1989–2004)
 Amstel Gold Race (1989–2004)
 Clásica de San Sebastián (1989–2004)
 Züri-Metzgete (1989–2004)
 Giro di Lombardia (1989–2004)

 Other events

 Wincanton Classic (1989–1997)
 Grand Prix des Amériques (1989–1992)
 Grand Prix des Nations (1990–1993)
 Rund um den Henninger-Turm (1995)
 Japan Cup (1996)
 HEW Cyclassics (1998–2004)
 Grand Prix de la Libération (1989–1991)

Winners

See also
 UCI Women's Road World Cup

References

External links
Official site (archives)

 
Road World Cup
Recurring sporting events established in 1989
UCI tours
Men's road cycling
Defunct cycle racing series
Recurring events disestablished in 2004